2-oxoglutarate and iron-dependent oxygenase domain containing 1, also known as OGFOD1, is a human gene.

Model organisms

Model organisms have been used in the study of OGFOD1 function. A conditional knockout mouse line, called Ogfod1tm1a(KOMP)Wtsi was generated as part of the International Knockout Mouse Consortium program — a high-throughput mutagenesis project to generate and distribute animal models of disease to interested scientists — at the Wellcome Trust Sanger Institute. Male and female animals underwent a standardized phenotypic screen to determine the effects of deletion. Twenty five  tests were carried out on homozygous mutant adult mice, however no significant abnormalities were observed.

References

Further reading 
 

 
 
 
 

Genes mutated in mice